HIV/AIDS: Research and Palliative Care is a peer-reviewed medical journal covering HIV and its treatment. The journal was established in 2009 and is published by Dove Medical Press. It is abstracted and indexed in PubMed, EMBASE, EmCare, and Scopus.

External links 
 

English-language journals
Open access journals
Dove Medical Press academic journals
HIV/AIDS journals
Publications established in 2009